Dance Hall is a 1950 British drama film directed by Charles Crichton. The film was an unusual departure for Ealing Studios at the time, as it tells the story about four women and their romantic encounters from a female perspective.

Plot
The storyline centres on four young female factory workers who escape the monotony of their jobs by spending their evenings at the Chiswick Palais, the local dance hall, where they have various problems with their boyfriends.

Main cast
 Donald Houston as Phil
 Bonar Colleano as Alec
 Natasha Parry as Eve
 Petula Clark as Georgie Wilson
 Jane Hylton as Mary
 Diana Dors as Carole
 Gladys Henson as Mrs Wilson
 Sydney Tafler as Jim Fairfax
 Douglas Barr as Peter
 Fred Johnson as Mr Wilson
 James Carney as Mike
 Kay Kendall as Doreen
 Eunice Gayson as Mona
 Dandy Nichols as Mrs Crabtree

Production
Filming took place in November 1949.

Peter Finch was offered a supporting role but did not appear in the final film. It was Donald Houston's second film.

The part of Alec was originally played by Dermot Walsh but he was replaced during filming by Bonar Colleano. "I did feel very cross about that," said Walsh later. "They'd ruined my career in first features."

The film was edited by Seth Holt, who called it "terrible." Actress Diana Dors later called it "a ghastly film - quite one of the nastiest I ever made" although she received positive reviews.

Music
The bands of Geraldo and Ted Heath provide most of the music in the dance hall.

Reception
Some critics felt that the lead actresses were too glamorous for the working-class ladies whom they represented but agreed that Clark, slowly emerging from her earlier children's roles, and Parry, in her screen debut, had captured the spirit of young postwar women clinging to the glamour and excitement of the dance hall.

The film premiered on 8 June 1950 at the Odeon Marble Arch in London. A review in The Times stated, "[T]he trouble with the film is that the characters do not match the authenticity of the background, and the working girls, who are the heroines, are too clearly girls who work in the studio and nowhere else" and concluded that the film "is not without its interest, but it does not quite live up to the high standards set by the Ealing Studios."

Unusually for an Ealing production of the time, the film tells the story about the four women and their romantic encounters from a female perspective, presumably the input of screenwriter Diana Morgan. The film retains interest as "an historical piece full of incidental detail: visual reminders of London bomb sites and trolleybuses, and references to Mac Fisheries, Music While You Work, football results and rationing."

FilmInk wrote: "Dors is easily the best thing about the film, playing a saucy minx out for a good time, and does not get nearly enough screen time. The film focuses more on the adventures of Parry, Hylton and … Donald Houston."

Director Charles Crichton later said "it wasn't a picture I particularly wanted to make but was quite interesting." He said the film "didn't do too well" so his career was "sliding" before being "rescued" by The Lavender Hill Mob.

References

External links
  
  
  
 
 
Review of film at Variety
Dance Hall at Letterbox DVD
Dance Hall at TCMDB

1950 films
1950 drama films
Ealing Studios films
Films directed by Charles Crichton
British black-and-white films
Films set in London
British drama films
1950s English-language films
1950s British films